Boris Georgievich Nevzorov (18 January 1950 – 18 February 2022) was a Russian actor and film director. He was an Honored Artist of the Russian Federation (1997) and a People's Artist of Russia (2011).

Life and career
Nevzorov spent his childhood and youth in Astrakhan. In 1967 and 1968, he was an actor of the Astrakhan Youth Theatre.

Theatre
In 1968 he entered the Mikhail Shchepkin Higher Theatre School, where he studied for two courses. In 1975 he graduated from the Moscow Art Theatre School. From 1975 to 1982, he was in the troupe of the Moscow New Drama Theatre. From 1984 to 1986 he was an actor at the Mossovet Theatre, then returned to the Moscow New Drama Theatre, where he worked until 1988. From 1988 to 1989 he worked in Moscow Gogol Drama Theatre. From 1993 to 2005, he was an actor of the Electrotheatre Stanislavsky. From 2005 until the end of his life he worked in the Maly Theater.

He taught at the Russian Institute of Theatre Arts.

Film career
He made his film debut in 1975 film Road. From 1989 to 1991, he worked at the Gorky Film Studio. He played Fedotov in drama The Fool.

He was the recipient of Vasilyev Brothers State Prize of the RSFSR.

Death
Nevzorov died from complications of COVID-19 in Moscow on 18 February 2022, at the age of 72.

Selected filmography

Actor

 Red Bells II (1982)
 Find and Neutralize (1982)
 Primary Russia (1985)
 Capablanca (1986)
 Stalingrad (1989)
 The Shore of Salvation (1990)
 The Flood (1994) as Trofim
 The Major (2013)
 The Fool (2014) as Fedotov

References

External links
 

1950 births
2022 deaths
People from Krasnodar Krai
Soviet male actors
Russian male actors
Russian male television actors
People's Artists of Russia
Honored Artists of the Russian Federation
Recipients of the Vasilyev Brothers State Prize of the RSFSR
Russian film directors
Moscow Art Theatre School alumni
Deaths from the COVID-19 pandemic in Russia